John G. Berylson is an American businessman and founder of Chestnut Hill Ventures LLC. He is also the chairman of London football team Millwall.

Education
Berylson attended Harvard Business School earning an M.B.A, Brown University earning an A.B. degree, and New York University, where he earned an M.S.

Career
He is the director of Youngworld Stores Group, Inc and Non Executive Chairman, Member of Audit Committee and Member of Remuneration Committee of Millwall Holdings PLC. Berylson has pumped an estimated £100m into the club. 

He is also the director of Manifold Capital Corp. Berylson has been reported as being a Republican, having donated to John McCain in the 2008 Presidential Election, however Berylson has denied this and said that he is a registered Democrat - "For the record, I am not a Republican Party supporter – I'm a registered Democrat". 

He is a formerly active US Marine, and a passionate fan of the Boston Red Sox. He holds numerous Trustee positions; at the Beth Israel Deaconess Medical Center, The Newton-Wellesley Hospital, Brown University Sports Foundation, and he holds the position of Director at the Brown University Library System.

Personal life
Berylson is an active philanthropist and he and his wife Amy move their philanthropy through the Amy Smith and John G. Berylson Foundation. They primarily support education, as well as supporting philanthropy in Boston through the Richard and Susan Smith Family Foundation.

References

Living people
American businesspeople
Harvard Business School alumni
Brown University alumni
New York University alumni
English football chairmen and investors
Millwall F.C. directors and chairmen
Year of birth missing (living people)